Ossola may refer to:

 Ossola, an area of Italy situated to the north of Lago Maggiore, in the Province of Verbano-Cusio-Ossola

People 
 Aldo Ossola (born 1945), Italian former basketball player
 Franco Ossola (1921–1949), Italian forward footballer
 Irena Ossola (born 1988), American professional racing cyclist
 Luigi Ossola (1938–2018), Italian professional football player
 Raffaello Ossola (born 1954), Swiss-born Italian surrealist painter
 Rinaldo Ossola (1913–1990), Italian economist and politician